Systema is a Russian martial art.

Systema may also refer to:

Systema Engineering, a Japanese airsoft gun manufacturer
Systema (electronics), a UK brand of electronics including the TV Boy and Systema 2000
Systēma, a Greek word for system

See also 
Systema Naturae, a 1735 taxonomy book by Carl Linnaeus
 
 Sistema (disambiguation)
 System (disambiguation)